TransitAmerica Services, Inc. is an American passenger rail service provider headquartered in St Joseph, Missouri. The company was established in 2002 as a joint venture between Herzog Transit Services and Stagecoach Group. In 2004, Herzog bought out Stagecoach, and the company became a wholly-owned subsidiary of Herzog Transit Services.

Corporate history 
In November 2002, Herzog Transit Services and Stagecoach Group announced a corporate partnership to form TransitAmerica.  In 2004, Stagecoach transferred its interest in the partnership to Herzog. On May 13, 2005, TransitAmerica was officially incorporated in the State of Missouri.

Caltrain 
In September 2011, Caltrain awarded TransitAmerica a contract to operate the system starting on May 26, 2012. The contract is for five years with five one-year options.

CTrail 
CTrail Hartford Line trains are currently operated by TransitAmerica Services and Alternate Concepts Inc., operating as a joint venture, under a 5-year, $45 million contract.

References 

Railway companies of the United States
Missouri railroads
Railway companies established in 2005
2005 establishments in Missouri